Lotte's Gift is a play by David Williamson. It was written as a deliberate attempt by Williamson to try something in a different style and was written as a vehicle for guitarist Karin Schaupp.

Background
Karin Schaupp approached Williamson in 2002 to write the project. She wanted to act in a production that combined drama with her musical skills. Williamson was enthusiastic and started asking Schaupp about her family history. When the guitarist told her about her grandmother Lotte, Williamson decided to structure the story around three generations of women in her family.

The play premiered at the 2006 Noosa Festival as Strings Under Her Fingers. It was subsequently reworked as Lotte's Gift.

References

External links
Karin Schaupp on the play at "Life Matters" on ABC Radio National
Review of Brisbane production at 4MBS Classic FM
Review of 2007 Sydney Production at Variety

Plays by David Williamson
2007 plays